Lester "Bo" McCalebb (born May 4, 1985) is an American-Macedonian former professional basketball player. He represented the senior Macedonian national team internationally. Born and raised in New Orleans, he attended the University of New Orleans. A two-time All-EuroLeague selection, McCalebb was part of the All-Tournament Team at EuroBasket 2011.

High school
McCalebb attended O. Perry Walker High School in New Orleans, Louisiana, where he played high school basketball.

College career
McCalebb played college basketball at the University of New Orleans. McCalebb was named the Sun Belt Conference Player of the Year in 2007. In his five-year career with the Privateers, he played in 128 games, averaging 20.9 points, 4.7 rebounds, and 3 assists per game.

Professional career

Mersin BB
McCalebb started his professional career in Turkey with Mersin Büyükşehir Belediyesi. He had a lot of success in Mersin, averaging 17.4 points and 4.7 assists per game during the 2008–09 season. He was also the Turkish Super League leader in steals, with 2.7 per game.

Partizan

On October 16, 2009, McCalebb signed a one-year contract with the Serbian club Partizan Belgrade, a week after the team released former point guard Milt Palacio for failure to join the team on time. He had an amazing season with Partizan winning the regional ABA League, Basketball League of Serbia and Cup titles. He also helped the team to reach the EuroLeague Final Four, and earned an All-EuroLeague Second Team selection.

Montepaschi Siena
In July 2010, McCalebb signed a three-year deal with the Italian club Montepaschi Siena.  In his first season in Italy, he had even more success, helping his team to the EuroLeague Final Four, and winning the Italian League, Cup, and Supercup. In 2012, he was named the Italian League MVP. In April 2012, McCalebb won the EuroLeague's Alphonso Ford Trophy, the annual award given to the EuroLeague's top scorer of the season. He averaged 16.9 points, 2.6 assists, and 2.2 rebounds per game, during the season, while shooting .613 from the field and .526 on three-pointers. He also earned a selection to the All-EuroLeague Second Team, for the second time in his career.

Fenerbahçe Ülker
During the summer of 2012, San Antonio Spurs were interested in signing McCalebb, but they did not reach a buyout agreement with Montepaschi Siena. In August 2012, McCalebb signed a three-year contract with the Turkish club Fenerbahçe Ülker. In June 2014, he left Fenerbahçe and became a free agent.

Bayern Munich
On November 19, 2014, McCalebb signed a one-month deal with the German club Bayern Munich. Over 5 regular season EuroLeague games he played for the team, he averaged 9.8 points, and a career-high 3.6 assists per game. On December 26, 2014, he extended his contract with the club until the end of January 2015. On January 10, 2015, he tore ligaments in one of his thumbs, which sidelined him off the court for several weeks. After the injury, he never played with Bayern again.

Pelicans / Limoges
On October 15, 2015, McCalebb signed with the NBA's New Orleans Pelicans. However, he was later waived by the Pelicans on October 24, after appearing in four preseason games. On January 3, 2016, McCalebb signed with French club Limoges, for the rest of the season.

Gran Canaria
On August 24, 2016, McCalebb signed with Herbalife Gran Canaria of the Spanish Liga ACB and the EuroCup.

Zaragoza
On December 13, 2017, McCalebb signed with Spanish club Tecnyconta Zaragoza for the rest of the 2017–18 ACB season.

National team career

In 2010, McCalebb accepted an offer to play for the senior men's Macedonian national basketball team, after which he received a Macedonian passport. The "Macedonian MVP" was the second leading scorer in the qualifying for the EuroBasket 2011, with a strong showing against Great Britain, and its NBA star Luol Deng.

EuroBasket 2011
On August 31, in the first tournament game for Macedonia, McCalebb scored 17 points in an overtime loss against Montenegro. On September 1, Macedonia played Croatia with McCalebb scoring 19 points. He had another strong showing versus Greece on September 3, scoring game-high 27 points and leading the team to a 72–58 win. On September 4, McCalebb scored 18 points against Finland in a 72–70 win. On September 5, McCalebb scored 22 points in a 75–63 win over Bosnia and Herzegovina, which qualified them to the second phase as the first place team in Group C. Then, on September 8 (Macedonia Independence Day), he led the team with 27 points in their 65–63 win over Georgia and thus placed Macedonia to the quarter-finals. In the last two games of the second phase, McCalebb scored 19 points in Macedonian victory against Slovenia, and 16 points in the dramatic loss against Russia. On September 14, Macedonia defeated the host nation Lithuania to qualify to the semi-finals. McCalebb scored 23 points. In the semi-finals Macedonia was defeated 92–80 by Spain, with McCalebb scoring 25 points. In the bronze medal battle, McCalebb scored 22 points, but Macedonia was defeated by Russia, in another dramatic game, 72–68.

McCalebb earned an All Tournament Team selection. During the tournament, he averaged 21.4 points, 3.1 rebounds, and 3.7 assists per game, in 34.2 minutes played per game. With 235 total points scored, McCalebb was the best scorer of the tournament in total points, but in points per game average, he was second behind Tony Parker, who played in one game less.

Career statistics

College

|-
| style="text-align:left;"| 2003–04
| style="text-align:left;" rowspan=5| New Orleans
| 31 || 15 || 26.1 || .441 || .311 || .606 || 3.5 || 2.0 || 1.4 || .1 || 13.1
|-
| style="text-align:left;"| 2004–05
| 30 || 30 || 34.9 || .480 || .260 || .567 || 4.3 || 3.7 || 1.8 || .2 || 22.6
|-
| style="text-align:left;"| 2005–06
| 4 || 4 || 33.3 || .379 || .300 || .657 || 2.5 || 1.5 || 3.8 || .5 || 19.0
|-
| style="text-align:left;"| 2006–07
| 31 || 31 || 34.5 || .478 || .333 || .710 || 6.8 || 3.3 || 2.0 || .2 || 25.0
|-
| style="text-align:left;"| 2007–08
| 32 || 32 || 33.3 || .506 || .405 || .772 || 4.5 || 3.1 || 2.4 || .1 || 23.2
|- class="sortbottom"
| style="text-align:left;"| Career
| style="text-align:left;"|
| 128 || 112 || 32.2 || .476 || .333 || .667 || 4.7 || 3.0 || 2.0 || .1 || 20.9

EuroLeague

|-
| style="text-align:left;"| 2009–10
| style="text-align:left;"| Partizan
| 22 || 22 || 30.1 || .457 || .232 || .759 || 2.9 || 3.4 || style="background:#cfecec;"| 2.0 || .0 || 13.4 || 12.7
|-
| style="text-align:left;"| 2010–11
| style="text-align:left;" rowspan=2| Montepaschi
| 15 || 9 || 20.8 || .549 || .438 || .880 || 2.0 || 2.1 || 1.8 || .0 || 11.5 || 13.1
|-
| style="text-align:left;"| 2011–12
| 17 || 17 || 27.7 || .613 || style="background:#CFECEC;"|.526 || .809 || 2.2 || 2.6 || 1.3 || .0 || style="background:#cfecec;"| 16.9 || 17.3
|-
| style="text-align:left;"| 2012–13
| style="text-align:left;" rowspan=2| Fenerbahçe
| 23 || 20 || 27.6 || .481 || .255 || .847 || 2.7 || 2.4 || style="background:#cfecec;"| 1.9 || .0 || 13.0 || 13.2
|-
| style="text-align:left;"| 2013–14
| 24 || 15 || 27.0 || .595 || .359 || .741 || 3.2 || 2.5 || 1.4 || .1 || 11.9 || 14.1
|-
| style="text-align:left;"| 2014–15
| style="text-align:left;"| Bayern
| 5 || 5 || 23.4 || .345 || .357 || .833 || 2.4 || 3.6 || .6 || .0 || 9.8 || 6.0
|- class="sortbottom"
| style="text-align:left;"| Career
| style="text-align:left;"|
| 106 || 88 || 26.8 || .521 || .336 || .798 || 2.7 || 2.7 || 1.6 || .0 || 13.1 || 13.5

Other leagues

See also
 List of NCAA Division I men's basketball career scoring leaders

References

External links

 Bo McCalebb at acb.com 
 Bo McCalebb at beko-bbl.de 
 Bo McCalebb at euroleague.net
 
 Bo McCalebb at FIBA.com (game center)
 Bo McCalebb at legabasket.it 
 Bo McCalebb at tblstat.net
 

1985 births
Living people
20th-century African-American people
21st-century African-American sportspeople
ABA League players
African-American basketball players
American expatriate basketball people in France
American expatriate basketball people in Germany
American expatriate basketball people in Italy
American expatriate basketball people in Serbia
American expatriate basketball people in Spain
American expatriate basketball people in Turkey
American men's basketball players
Basketball League of Serbia players
Basketball players from New Orleans
Basket Zaragoza players
CB Gran Canaria players
FC Bayern Munich basketball players
Fenerbahçe men's basketball players
KK Partizan players
Liga ACB players
Limoges CSP players
Macedonian people of African-American descent
Macedonian expatriate basketball people in Serbia
Macedonian men's basketball players
Macedonian expatriate basketball people in Spain
Macedonian expatriate basketball people in Germany
Macedonian expatriate basketball people in France
Mens Sana Basket players
Mersin Büyükşehir Belediyesi S.K. players
New Orleans Privateers men's basketball players
Point guards